Walter Wesley (born January 25, 1945) is an American former professional basketball player.

Early life
Wesley grew up in Fort Myers, Florida, the son of Leroy and Josie Wesley. He attended Dunbar High School in Fort Myers.

College career
The top university basketball programs weren't yet recruiting African-American players, but Wesley was recruited by programs in the Midwest. Wesley was quoted, "It's not that we weren't capable, or good enough academically. We just weren't recruited. There was a segregated system, and it was tough. Fortunately, I was recruited by several schools out of the midwest and that's where I chose to go."

The 6'11" center chose to attend the University of Kansas and play for its storied program and became a two-time, unanimous selection, All-American.

In his first varsity season as a sophomore in 1963–64, Wesley averaged 10.5 points per game (ppg) and 5.9 rebounds per game (rpg). In his junior year, he became a dominant center, with a career-best 23.5 ppg and 8.8 rpg for the 17–8 Jayhawks.

In his senior season of 1965–66, Wesley averaged 20.7 ppg and a career-best 9.3 rpg as the Jayhawks won the Big 8 championship and were 23-4 overall. In the postseason, Wesley unwittingly found himself in a position that one day inspired the movie Glory Road. In the 1966 Midwest Regional Finals in Lubbock, Texas, the #4-ranked Jayhawks were in a tight game with #2-ranked Texas Western, now the University of Texas at El Paso (UTEP). Wesley set a pick and Jo Jo White made a 30-foot shot at the buzzer which seemingly sent the Jayhawks to the Final Four. But then a whistle blew, White was ruled as having stepped out of bounds, Texas Western won in double-overtime and would go on to win the title.

On December 18, 2004, his jersey was retired by the University of Kansas and hangs on a banner in Allen Fieldhouse. The banners display the player's surname over his/her number, but the numbers themselves are reused.

College statistics

|-
| align="left" | 1963–64
| align="left" | Kansas
| 16 || - || - || .450 || - || .597 || 5.9 || - || - || - || 10.6
|-
| align="left" | 1964–65
| align="left" | Kansas
| 25 || - || - || .496 || - || .576 || 8.8 || - || - || - || 23.5
|-
| align="left" | 1965–66
| align="left" | Kansas
| 27 || - || - || .478 || - || .607 || 9.3 || - || - || - || 20.7
|- class="sortbottom"
| style="text-align:center;" colspan="2"| Career
| 68 || - || - || .482 || - || .594 || 8.3 || - || - || - || 19.3
|}

NBA career
Wesley was chosen in the first round (sixth overall) of the 1966 NBA draft by the Cincinnati Royals.

In his rookie season as a backup center, Wesley played 14 minutes per game, averaging 4.9 ppg and 5.1 rpg. His high-point game was 19 points on March 11, 1967 against the Chicago Bulls. During the 1967–68 and 1968–69 seasons, his playing time and stat line remained about the same, although by his third season his scoring had risen to 7.6 ppg, a season in which he played in all 82 games. On December 15, 1967, he scored a then career-best 22 points on December 15, 1967 against the Detroit Pistons.

Prior to his fourth season, 1969–70, he was traded to the Chicago Bulls. His playing time rose to 19.5 minutes per game, and career bests of 9.5 ppg and 6.3 rpg.

After that season, Wesley was selected in the 1970 expansion draft by the Cleveland Cavaliers for the 1970–71 season, his fifth. Becoming the Cavaliers starting center, Wesley had by far his most productive season. Playing in all 82 games, he averaged career-highs of 17.7 ppg and 8.7 rpg, both of which led the Cavaliers. On December 6, 1970 he exploded for a career-high 36 points against the New York Knicks. But that was just a harbinger for what was to come. On February 19, 1971, Wesley scored 50 points against his first team, the Cincinnati Royals. In the 125-109 Cavaliers win, Wesley poured in 20 field goals and was 10-for-14 from the free throw line.

In 1971–72, Wesley again played all 82 games, with 12.4 ppg and tying his career-best of 8.7 rpg. In 1972–73, after 12 games with the Cavs, he was traded to the Phoenix Suns. For the season overall, he played in 57 games but, now in a backup role, he averaged only 3.2 ppg and 2.6 rpg. After the season, he was traded to the Capital Bullets.

For the next three seasons, he continued as a backup, playing just a few minutes per game, for the Bullets, Philadelphia 76ers, Milwaukee Bucks, and one game during 1975–76, his 10th and final NBA season, for the Los Angeles Lakers.

He averaged 8.5 ppg and 5.5 rpg over the course of his career.

NBA career statistics

Regular season

|-
| align="left" | 1966–67
| align="left" | Cincinnati
| 64 || - || 14.2 || .393 || - || .423 || 5.1 || 0.3 || - || - || 4.9
|-
| align="left" | 1967–68
| align="left" | Cincinnati
| 66 || - || 13.9 || .465 || - || .500 || 4.3 || 0.5 || - || - || 6.8
|-
| align="left" | 1968–69
| align="left" | Cincinnati
| 82 || - || 16.3 || .459 || - || .647 || 4.9 || 0.6 || - || - || 7.6
|-
| align="left" | 1969–70
| align="left" | Chicago
| 72 || - || 19.5 || .417 || - || .662 || 6.3 || 0.9 || - || - || 9.5
|-
| align="left" | 1970–71
| align="left" | Cleveland
| 82 || - || 29.6 || .455 || - || .687 || 8.7 || 1.0 || - || - || 17.7
|-
| align="left" | 1971–72
| align="left" | Cleveland
| 82 || - || 26.6 || .410 || - || .674 || 8.7 || 0.9 || - || - || 12.4
|-
| align="left" | 1972–73
| align="left" | Cleveland
| 12 || - || 9.2 || .298 || - || .667 || 3.2 || 0.6 || - || - || 3.0
|-
| align="left" | 1972–73
| align="left" | Phoenix
| 45 || - || 8.1 || .406 || - || .529 || 2.5 || 0.5 || - || - || 3.2
|-
| align="left" | 1973–74
| align="left" | Capital
| 39 || - || 10.3 || .470 || - || .605 || 3.5 || 0.4 || 0.2 || 0.5 || 4.3
|-
| align="left" | 1974–75
| align="left" | Philadelphia
| 4 || - || 8.3 || .556 || - || .500 || 2.0 || 0.3 || 0.0 || 0.0 || 3.0
|-
| align="left" | 1974–75
| align="left" | Milwaukee
| 41 || - || 5.2 || .440 || - || .609 || 1.3 || 0.3 || 0.2 || 0.1 || 2.1
|-
| align="left" | 1975–76
| align="left" | Los Angeles
| 1 || - || 7.0 || .500 || - || .500 || 1.0 || 1.0 || 0.0 || 0.0 || 4.0
|- class="sortbottom"
| style="text-align:center;" colspan="2"| Career
| 590 || - || 17.5 || .434 || - || .630 || 5.5 || 0.7 || 0.2 || 0.3 || 8.5
|}

Playoffs

|-
| align="left" | 1966–67
| align="left" | Cincinnati
| 3 || - || 7.7 || .200 || - || .000 || 3.0 || 0.0 || - || - || 1.3
|-
| align="left" | 1969–70
| align="left" | Chicago
| 4 || - || 14.8 || .516 || - || .500 || 4.8 || 0.5 || - || - || 9.5
|-
| align="left" | 1973–74
| align="left" | Capital
| 1 || - || 1.0 || .000 || - || .000 || 0.0 || 0.0 || 0.0 || 0.0 || 0.0
|- class="sortbottom"
| style="text-align:center;" colspan="2"| Career
| 8 || - || 10.4 || .439 || - || .500 || 3.5 || 0.3 || 0.0 || 0.0 || 5.3
|}

Personal life
After retiring from the NBA, Wesley served as an assistant coach at the University of Kansas, Western Michigan University and at U.S. Military Academy at West Point. |Army]].

Wesley's jersey was retired by the University of Kansas and Dunbar High School.  He was inducted into the Ohio Basketball Hall of Fame, Kansas Hall of Fame, University of Kansas Hall Of Fame, National High School Basketball Hall of Fame, Court of Legends, and the Florida Association of Basketball Coaches. He also received the Alpha Phi Alpha fraternity "Jessie Owens Award of Excellence" for athletic and philanthropic accomplishments, awarded at the 104th Anniversary Convention of Alpha Phi Alpha, Las Vegas, Nevada in July 2010.

In October 2018, Wesley was honored as the Jazz at Lincoln Center Orchestra led by Wynton Marsalis, was commissioned by the Lied Center of Kansas to create a new work honoring 15 KU Basketball Legends.  The movement created for Walt was "Walt's Waltz".

References

1945 births
Living people
African-American basketball players
All-American college men's basketball players
American men's basketball players
Basketball players from Florida
Capital Bullets players
Centers (basketball)
Chicago Bulls players
Cincinnati Royals draft picks
Cincinnati Royals players
Cleveland Cavaliers expansion draft picks
Cleveland Cavaliers players
Kansas Jayhawks men's basketball players
Los Angeles Lakers players
Milwaukee Bucks players
Philadelphia 76ers players
Phoenix Suns players
Sportspeople from Fort Myers, Florida
21st-century African-American people
20th-century African-American sportspeople